Exonuclease 1 is an enzyme that in humans is encoded by the EXO1 gene.

This gene encodes a protein with 5' to 3' exonuclease activity as well as RNase activity (endonuclease activity cleaving RNA on DNA/RNA hybrid). It is similar to the Saccharomyces cerevisiae protein Exo1 which interacts with Msh2 and which is involved in DNA mismatch repair and homologous recombination. Alternative splicing of this gene results in three transcript variants encoding two different isoforms.

Meiosis

ExoI is essential for meiotic progression through metaphase I in the budding yeast Saccharomyces cerevisiae and in mouse.

Recombination during meiosis is often initiated by a DNA double-strand break (DSB) as illustrated in the accompanying diagram. During recombination, sections of DNA at the 5' ends of the break are cut away in a process called resection. In the strand invasion step that follows, an overhanging 3' end of the broken DNA molecule "invades" the DNA of a homologous chromosome that is not broken, forming a displacement loop (D-loop). After strand invasion, the further sequence of events may follow either of two main pathways leading to a crossover (CO) or a non-crossover (NCO) recombinant (see Genetic recombination and Homologous recombination).  The pathway leading to a CO involves a double Holliday junction (DHJ) intermediate. Holliday junctions need to be resolved for CO recombination to be completed.

During meiosis in S. cerevisiae, transcription of the Exo1 gene is highly induced.   In meiotic cells, Exo1 mutation reduces the processing of DSBs and the frequency of COs.  Exo1 has two temporally and biochemically distinct functions in meiotic recombination.  First, Exo1 acts as a 5’–3’ nuclease to resect DSB-ends.  Later in the recombination process, Exo1 acts to facilitate the resolution of DHJs into COs, independently of its nuclease activities.  In resolving DHJs, Exo 1 acts together with MLH1-MLH3 heterodimer (MutL gamma) and Sgs1 (ortholog of Bloom syndrome helicase) to define a joint molecule resolution pathway that produces the majority of crossovers.

Male mice deficient for Exo1 are capable of normal progress through the pachynema stage of meiosis, but most germ cells fail to progress normally to metaphase I due to dynamic loss of chiasmata. Surprisingly though, this meiotic role of Exo1 is not mediated by its nuclease activity per se, since Exo1-DA mice harboring a point mutation in Exo1's nuclease domain have no detectable meoitic defects.

Interactions
Exonuclease 1 has been shown to interact with MSH2 and MLH1.

References

Further reading